Illuminations is a piano album by McCoy Tyner released on the Telarc label in 2004. It was recorded in November 2003 and features performance by Tyner with alto saxophonist Gary Bartz, trumpeter Terence Blanchard, bassist Christian McBride, and drummer Lewis Nash.

Reception
It won the Grammy Award for 'Best Instrumental Jazz Album, Individual or Group' in 2005. The Allmusic review by Ken Dryden states that "This is yet another essential release by the always enjoyable McCoy Tyner".

Track listing
All compositions by McCoy Tyner except where noted.
 "Illuminations"  –  6:12  
 "Angelina"  –  8:50  
 "New Orleans Stomp"  –  5:58  
 "Come Rain or Come Shine" (Arlen)  –  5:35  
 "Soulstice" (Bartz) –  5:24  
 "Blessings" (Blanchard) - 4:52  
 "If I Should Lose You" (Rainger, Robin) –  6:27  
 "The Chase" –  3:17  
 "West Philly Tone Poem" (McBride) – 4:01  
 "Alone Together" (Schwartz)  –  7:10

Personnel
McCoy Tyner  piano
Terence Blanchard –  trumpet
Gary Bartz –  alto saxophone
Christian McBride –  bass
Lewis Nash –  drums

References

McCoy Tyner albums
2004 albums
Telarc Records albums
Grammy Award for Best Jazz Instrumental Album